Paraburkholderia caledonica is a species of Pseudomonadota.

References

caledonica
Bacteria described in 2001